The Limónes Formation is a geologic formation in Costa Rica. It preserves fossils dating back to the Neogene period.

See also

 List of fossiliferous stratigraphic units in Costa Rica

References
 

Neogene Costa Rica
Geologic formations of Costa Rica